Gimli Motorsports Park is a multi-track motorsports facility located in Gimli, Manitoba, Canada. The 95-hectare facility features a 1/4-mile dragstrip, a 1.3-mile road racing course, a one-kilometre karting track and a two-kilometre motocross track. The park hosts events for motorsports groups including the Winnipeg Sports Car Club, Drag Racing Association of Manitoba, Manitoba Roadracing Association (Superbikes), and the Manitoba Karting Association.

History

On August 6, 1972 the Winnipeg Sports Car Club organized the first road racing event on one of the original decommissioned parallel runways of RCAF Station Gimli which had closed the previous year in September 1971.  Racing switched to the current dedicated  course in 1973. Gimli Industrial Park Airport continues to operate on the second runway of the World War II airfield.

Gimli Motorsport Park was the site of the infamous Gimli Glider incident in 1983, an aviation accident in which Air Canada Flight 143, a Boeing 767, ran out of fuel and landed on the former runway, then operating as the race track during a Formula Ford race. There were no serious injuries reported, and the plane suffered minimal damage.

From 1990 to 1996, Gimli Motorsports Park was the host of the Sunfest rock festival, which was attended by tens of thousands of people every August.

Interlake Dragway

Interlake Dragway is a 1/4-mile IHRA sanctioned drag strip located inside the road course. Drag racing started at the facility in 1978, and has previously operated under the names Dragways International, Viking Dragway, and Gimli Dragway.

Former series and major race winners

CASC Atlantic Championship

Gimli Motorsport Park hosted the CASC Player's Challenge Series (Formula B / Atlantic Championship) from 1972 to 1977 including Gilles Villeneuve's first victory in Formula Atlantic on June 22, 1975.

See also
 List of auto racing tracks in Canada
 RCAF Station Gimli
 Gimli Industrial Park Airport

References

External links 
Official Site
Interlake Dragway Official Site
Winnipeg Sports Car Club
Manitoba Roadracing Association
Manitoba Karting Association

Motorsports_Park
Motorsport in Canada
Motorsport venues in Manitoba
Road racing venues in Canada
Drag racing venues in Canada